Leonard Mann (15 November 1895 – 29 April 1981) was an Australian poet, and novelist.

Life
He served in the Australian Imperial Force during World War I, and with the Department of Aircraft Production in World War II.

He was, in September 1949, a charter member of the Australian Peace Council.

Awards
 1957 Grace Leven Prize for Poetry
 Australian Literature Society's gold medal (for his first novel, Flesh in Armour)

Works

Poetry

Novels
 Flesh in Armour (1932)

Anthologies

References

External links
["Remembering the war: Australian novelists in the interwar years.", Australian Literary Studies]

1895 births
1981 deaths
20th-century Australian poets
Australian male poets
ALS Gold Medal winners
20th-century Australian male writers
Australian male novelists
Australian pacifists